Flora 'Babs' Anderson is a former Botswana international lawn bowler.

In 1986 she won bronze medal in the singles at the 1986 Commonwealth Games in Edinburgh. She has represented Botswana at four consecutive Commonwealth Games from 1986 until 1998.

Flora started bowling in 1972 and won the national title on multiple occasions. She also represented Botswana at the first African Nations Tournament.

Her bronze medal in 1986 was the first Commonwealth Games medal to be won by Botswana.

References

Living people
Commonwealth Games bronze medallists for Botswana
Bowls players at the 1986 Commonwealth Games
Bowls players at the 1990 Commonwealth Games
Bowls players at the 1994 Commonwealth Games
Bowls players at the 1998 Commonwealth Games
Commonwealth Games medallists in lawn bowls
Year of birth missing (living people)
Medallists at the 1986 Commonwealth Games